Suwanji Madanayake (born 28 August 1972) is a Sri Lankan cricketer. He studied at Kingswood College, Kandy. He has played in more than 130 first-class matches since 1991/92.

References

External links
 

1972 births
Living people
Sri Lankan cricketers
Burgher Recreation Club cricketers
Kalutara Town Club cricketers
Kandy Youth Cricket Club cricketers
Kurunegala Youth Cricket Club cricketers
Lankan Cricket Club cricketers
Moors Sports Club cricketers
Nondescripts Cricket Club cricketers
Sri Lanka Police Sports Club cricketers
Ragama Cricket Club cricketers
Sebastianites Cricket and Athletic Club cricketers
Sri Lanka Air Force Sports Club cricketers
Vauniya District cricketers
Sportspeople from Kandy
Alumni of Kingswood College, Kandy